Grenoble Foot 38, commonly referred to as simply Grenoble or GF38, is a French association football club based in Grenoble. The club plays its home matches at the Stade des Alpes, a sports complex based in the heart of the city, and wears white and blue.

The original incarnation of the club was founded in 1911 and, in 1997, was formed into the club that exists today as a result of a merger. Grenoble currently plays in Ligue 2, the second level of French football, after having gone into bankruptcy and relegation to the fifth level of French football in 2011.

History 
The club was founded in 1911 as Football Club de Grenoble. In 1997, a merger of Olympique Grenoble Isère and Norcap Olympique led to the Grenoble Foot 38 incarnation. Olympique Grenoble Isère played in Ligue 1 in the 1960–61 and 1962–63 seasons.

In 2004, Grenoble Foot was acquired by Index Holdings, a Japanese mobile software company, therefore becoming the first French football club to have foreign owners. The price of the deal was around €2 million. The new owners invested in the Stade des Alpes, a new ground with an initial capacity of 20,000 which opened in February 2008. Grenoble finished the 2007–08 Ligue 2 season in third place, thus returning to Ligue 1 for the first time since 1963.

In the 2008–09 Ligue 1 season, Grenoble finished 13th. However, after losing their first eleven games of the following season, they were eventually relegated with six games remaining amidst severe financial problems. In the same season, Grenoble reached the semi-finals of the Coupe de France for the only time, defeating Monaco 2–0 at home in the quarter-finals on 18 March 2009, and losing by a single goal to Rennes in the semi-finals on 21 April.

The professional football club was liquidated in July 2011 with debts of €2.9 million, and relegated administratively to Championnat de France Amateur 2, the fifth tier. Index provided false financial statements during their ownership of the club.

Now an amateur side, Grenoble won promotion from Championnat de France Amateur 2 at the first attempt in 2012, and were champions of the 2016–17 Championnat de France Amateur, returning to Championnat National for the 2017–18 season. They secured their second successive promotion to Ligue 2 on 27 May 2018, after an aggregate play-off victory over Bourg-en-Bresse.

Name changes 
 Football Club de Grenoble (1911–1977)
 Football Club Association Sportive de Grenoble (1977–1984)
 Football Club de Grenoble Dauphiné (1984–1990)
 Football Club de Grenoble Isère (1990–1992)
 Football Club de Grenoble Jojo Isère (1992–1993)
 Olympique Grenoble Isère (1993–1997)
 Grenoble Foot 38 (1997–present)

Players

Current squad

Out on loan

Notable players 

Below are the notable former players who have represented Grenoble and its predecessors.

For a complete list of Grenoble Foot 38 players, see :Category:Grenoble Foot 38 players

 Ruben Aguilar
 Laurent Batlles
 Laurent Courtois
 Gaël Danic
 Youri Djorkaeff
 Laurent David
 Julien François
 Olivier Giroud
 Biagui Kamissoko
 Sandy Paillot
 Steven Pelé
 Martial Robin
 Jérémy Stinat
 Florian Thauvin
 Grégory Wimbée
 Nassim Akrour
 Sofiane Feghouli
 Saphir Taïder
 Walid Regragui
 Sergio Rojas
 Hristo Yanev
 Bertin Tokéné
 Zdeněk Nehoda
 Franck Dja Djédjé
 Milivoje Vitakić
 Charles Pickel
 Robert Malm
 Alaixys Romao
 Daisuke Matsui
 Masashi Oguro
 Moussa Djitté
 Ibrahima Sonko
 Gustavo Poyet

Coaching staff

Managers 

Jules Dewaquez (1945–1946)
R. Lacoste (1953–1954)
G. Dupraz (1957–1958)
A. Fornetti (1958–1963)
Albert Batteux (1963–1967)
R. Abad (1967–1970)
René Gardien (1970–1971)
J. Donnard (1971–1972)
R. Garcin (1972–1975)
Jean Deloffre (1975–1978)
R. Belloni (1978–1980)
Michel Lafranceschina (1980–1981)
Jean Djorkaeff (1981–1983)
Claude Le Roy (1983–1985)
Robert Buigues (1985–1986)
Christian Dalger (1986–1989)
Patrick Parizon (1989–1990)
Noël Tosi (1990–1991)
Bernard Simondi (1991–1993)
B. David (1993–1994)
C. Letard (1994–1995)
É. Geraldes (1995–1996)
Bernard Simondi (1996–1997)
Alain Michel (1997–2001)
Marc Westerloppe (2001–2002)
Alain Michel (2002–2004)
Thierry Goudet (2004–2006)
Yvon Pouliquen (2006–2007)
Mehmed Baždarević (2007–2010)
Yvon Pouliquen (2010–2011)
Olivier Saragaglia (2012–2015)
Jean-Louis Garcia (2015–2016)
Olivier Guégan (2016–2018)
Philippe Hinschberger (2018–2021)
Maurizio Jacobacci (2021)
Vincent Hognon (2021–present)

Honours 
Ligue 2
Champions: 1960, 1962
Championnat National
Champions: 2001
Coppa delle Alpi
Runners-up: 1963
Coupe Gambardella
Runners-up: 1987, 1990

References

External links 

 
Association football clubs established in 1911
1911 establishments in France
Football clubs in Auvergne-Rhône-Alpes
Sport in Grenoble
Ligue 1 clubs